Fiona Choi is an Australian-born Chinese actress, singer and performer, best-known for her lead role as Jenny Law in Benjamin Law's award-winning SBS Comedy The Family Law for which she received an AACTA Award nomination for Best Performance in a Television Comedy and 3 consecutive Equity Ensemble Awards for Outstanding Performance in a Comedy Series. Fiona is also known for her work on stage in Melbourne Theatre Company's Golden Shield and Torch The Place as well as her one-woman show Dragon Lady: The Many Lives & Deaths of Anna May Wong which premiered to much acclaim at the 2019 Adelaide Cabaret Festival

Early life
Fiona Choi was born in Melbourne, Australia to Chinese immigrant parents. She began acting as a child, appearing musical roles including Nicky in Sweet Charity, Chiffon in Little Shop of Horrors, Squeaky Fromme in Assassins and Eva Peron in Evita.  She graduated from Monash University with a Bachelor of Commerce, but did this primarily to please her parents. After this she moved to Perth for a Bachelor of Arts in musical theatre at the Western Australian Academy of Performing Arts at Edith Cowan University.

Career
Upon graduation Choi was cast in the original Australian company of Rent. Her other Australian theater credits include Metamorpheses, directed by Mary Zimmerman, for the MTC, and Mamma Mia!, directed by Phyllida Lloyd.  Choi had a two-month guest arc as Laura Wallace on the Australian show Neighbours.

Choi moved to New York in 2003 to continue her acting career.  Her film and TV credits include: Homeland, Law & Order: Criminal Intent, Person Of Interest, New Year's Eve, Unforgettable and The Newsroom.

She was involved in the development of the musicals Apathy: A Gen X Musical and FAMBAM360.

In 2015, Choi returned to Australia to star as Jenny Law in The Family Law. Produced by Matchbox Pictures and airing on SBS in Australia. The Family Law was nominated for a 2016 AACTA Award for best comedy. Choi was nominated for an AACTA Award for Best Performance In A Television Comedy. Season 2 aired on SBS in 2017  and season 3 followed in 2019. All 3 seasons of The Family Law earned its cast an Equity Ensemble Award for Outstanding Performance in a Comedy Series.

Fiona played Cindy Nguyen in all 3 seasons of Mustangs FC and has guest-starred in The Letdown, Wentworth, Utopia, True Story with Hamish & Andy, My Life is Murder and Harrow.

Choi has also worked as casting director for the North American musical tours of Scooby-Doo Live! Musical Mysteries and Chuggington.  She has also cast talent for assorted on-air promo campaigns.

In 2019, Choi performed in Golden Shield for Melbourne Theatre Company, followed by Torch The Place in 2020 which had a truncated season due to the coronavirus disease 2019.

References

External links

Lee, Nicole (14 January 2016). "The Family Law review: a loving and gently funny Australian family drama". The Guardian.

Living people
Australian people of Chinese descent
Actresses from Melbourne
Australian television actresses
Year of birth missing (living people)
Australian actresses of Chinese descent